St. George is a feature on Earth's Moon, a crater in the Hadley–Apennine region.  Astronauts David Scott and James Irwin drove their rover onto what was suspected to be its ejecta blanket in 1971, on the Apollo 15 mission, during EVA 1.  They collected samples to the northeast of the crater, at Geology Station 2 of the mission.

St. George crater is located on the west slope of Mons Hadley Delta and approximately 4 km southwest of the Apollo 15 landing point.  Bridge crater is to the northwest and Elbow crater is to the northeast.

The name of the crater was formally adopted by the IAU in 1973.

Station 2

External links
 Apollo 15 Traverses, Lunar Photomap 41B4S4(25)

References

Impact craters on the Moon